The thick-billed miner (Geositta crassirostris) is a species of bird in the family Furnariidae. It is endemic to Peru.

Its natural habitat is subtropical or tropical high-altitude shrubland.

Gallery

References

thick-billed miner
Birds of the Peruvian Andes
Endemic birds of Peru
thick-billed miner
thick-billed miner
Taxonomy articles created by Polbot